Sir Bartholomew Reade (or Rede; died 1505) was an English goldsmith and politician who served as Lord Mayor of London.

Family 
Reade was born in Cromer, Norfolk. His parents were Roger Reade (d. 1470) and his wife Catherine, and he had at least two siblings, John and Simon. He was already well-established in London by 1486, when he is mentioned in his mother's will as a "citizen and goldsmith of London".

Offices 

Reade, a goldsmith, was for several years the Master of the Mint. Along with Lord Daubeney, he was commissioned to mint the first gold sovereigns in 1489. He was one of the Sheriffs of London in 1497. Two years later, he was alderman of the ward of Aldersgate. He was elected Lord Mayor of London in 1502, succeeding fellow goldsmith John Shaa. During his mayoralty, he used Crosby Place, which he had acquired in 1501, as his hall. He is recorded as throwing extravagant feasts for ambassadors sent by Emperor Maximilian.

Death 
Reade died in 1505. He and his wife were interred at the church of St John Zachary, the burial place of many of the city's prominent goldsmiths. In his will, he established a free school in his home town of Cromer, under the management of the Goldsmiths' Company.

References 

15th-century births
Year of birth unknown
1505 deaths
Sheriffs of the City of London
16th-century lord mayors of London
English goldsmiths